The 1958 Taça de Portugal Final was the final match of the 1957–58 Taça de Portugal, the 18th season of the Taça de Portugal, the premier Portuguese football cup competition organized by the Portuguese Football Federation (FPF). The match was played on 15 June 1958 at the Estádio Nacional in Oeiras, and opposed two Primeira Liga sides: Benfica and Porto. Porto defeated Benfica 1–0 to claim a second Taça de Portugal.

Match

Details

References

1958
Taca
S.L. Benfica matches
FC Porto matches